"Soul" is a song written by Kevin Kadish and Tony Perrari, and recorded by American country music singer Lee Brice. It was released on November 29, 2021 as the third single from Brice's fifth studio album Hey World.

Content
Kevin Kadish and Tony Perrari wrote "Soul" in 2020. The song was described by Taste of Country writer Billy Dukes as having a "sweet melody and sexy sentiment". Dukes also noted how the writers altered the word "toes" to "toeses" to make it fit the song's rhyme scheme. Morgan Raum of Country Now stated that the song had an "upbeat melody and extremely catchy chorus".

In January 2022, Brice released the song's music video, directed by Justin Clough and Chase Lauer.

The song was certified gold by the Recording Industry Association of America (RIAA) in August 2022, honoring 500,000 certified downloads.

Chart performance

Weekly charts

Year-end charts

References

2020 songs
2021 singles
Lee Brice songs
Curb Records singles
Songs written by Kevin Kadish